The Islamic Azad University, Bojnourd Branch is located in Bojnourd, North Khorasan, Iran.

Faculties
 College of Engineering
 College of Basic Sciences
 College of Law, Political sciences & Foreign Languages
 College of Humanities & Management
 School of Medicine
 School of Architecture & Urbanology
 School of Sport Sciences

Bojnourd
Education in North Khorasan Province
1987 establishments in Iran
Buildings and structures in North Khorasan Province
Educational institutions established in 1987